Argyropeza divina is a species of sea snail, a marine gastropod mollusk in the family Procerithiidae.

References

External links

Procerithiidae
Gastropods described in 1901